Luojiang also transcribed from Tibetan as Norbukyungzê is a town in and the seat of Bainang County, in the Shigatse prefecture-level city of the Tibet Autonomous Region of China. At the time of the 2010 census, the town had a population of 7,243. , it had 15 villages under its administration.

References 

Township-level divisions of Tibet
Populated places in Shigatse